Ferreñafe District is one of six districts of the province Ferreñafe in Peru.

References

Districts of the Ferreñafe Province